The Diocese of Bauchi is a Latin Church ecclesiastical territory or diocese of the Catholic Church in Northern Nigeria. It is a suffragan diocese in the ecclesiastical province of the metropolitan Archdiocese of Jos in, yet depends on the missionary Roman Congregation for the Evangelization of Peoples.

Its cathedral is the Cathedral of St. John Evangelist, located in the episcopal see of Bauchi in Bauchi State.

History 
 Established on 5 July 1996 as Apostolic Vicariate of Bauchi, on territory split off from its Metropolitan, the Archdiocese of Jos
 Promoted on 31 December 2003 as Diocese of Bauchi/ Bauchian(us) (Latin adjective)

Statistics 
, it pastorally served 79,000 Catholics (1.2% of 6,742,000 total) on 66,102 km² in 23 parishes and 1 mission with 39 priests (34 diocesan, 5 religious), 18 lay religious (9 brothers, 9 sisters) and 13 seminarians.

Episcopal ordinaries

Apostolic Vicar of Bauchi 
 John Moore, Society of African Missions (S.M.A.) (born Ireland) (5 July 1996 – 31 December 2003 see below), Titular Bishop of Gigthi (1996.07.05 – 2003.12.12)

Suffragan Bishops of Bauchi
 John Moore, S.M.A. (see above December 31, 2003 — death 20 January 2010)
 Malachy John Goltok (18 March 2011 – death 21 March 2015)
 Bishop-elect Hilary Nanman Dachelem, Claretians (C.M.F.) (31 May 2017 – ...), no previous prelature.

See also 
 List of Catholic dioceses in Nigeria
 Roman Catholicism in Nigeria

Sources and external links 
 GCatholic.org - data for all sections
 Official website of the Diocese of Bauchi 
 Catholic Hierarchy

Roman Catholic dioceses in Nigeria
Religious organizations established in 1996
Roman Catholic dioceses and prelatures established in the 20th century
Roman Catholic Ecclesiastical Province of Jos